Richard Weinberger (born June 7, 1990) is a Canadian long-distance swimmer. Weinberger won a bronze medal at the 2012 Summer Olympics in London in the 10-kilometre open water marathon.  He is the 2011 Pan American Games champion and also has a bronze medal from the 2010 Pan Pacific Swimming Championships.

Career
Open water swimming at major international competitions started early for Weinberger.  He started making a name for himself at the 2010 Pan Pacific Championships where he won bronze as a twenty-year-old, then he went on to win the gold at the 2011 Pan American Championships in Guadalajara in the marathon 10 km event. 2012 proved to be a breakthrough year for Weinberger. In the lead up to the 2012 Summer Olympics in London, England, he won bronze and silver medals in the 10 km swim at various World Cup events.  Weinberger qualified for the Olympics after he won silver at the FINA Olympic Marathon Swimming Qualifier in June 2012.

At the 2012 Games, he won a bronze medal in the 10 km marathon, finishing behind Oussama Mellouli of Tunisia and Thomas Lurz of Germany. He became the first Canadian to win a medal in the event. After his win some media outlets such as the CBC were touting him as the future of Canadian Olympian swimmers. Weinberger himself said of his accomplishments that he was happy but "I want to be the Olympic champion in Rio in 2016."

During the 2013 World Aquatics Championships Weinberger was unable to repeat his Olympic success in the 10 km event and committed "a fatal mistake" when he missed a buoy and had to retreat from the front of the pack to swim around it again. He did however come within seven tenths of a second of a medal despite this, but only finished fifth. He himself noted his mistake and frustration, stating "I'm one of the strongest guys out there and I know I could have come first. It's just so disappointing that I made such an amateur mistake and I didn't notice the turning buoy pass on my right." Weinberger was looking for redemption in his next event the 25 km but was unable to regain the success where he finished 22nd, finishing fifteen minutes behind the winner Thomas Lurz.

He won the Silver Medal at the 2015 FINA World Cup event in Chun'an China then later that year qualified for the 2016 Summer Olympics by finishing 8th (top 10 qualified) at the FINA World Championships in Kazan, Russia.  Richard also went on to finish 3rd at the 2015 Rio Olympic Test Event.

Weinberger was named to Canada's Olympic team for the 2016 Summer Olympics. He headed to Rio with a strong performance at the 2016 FINA World Cup event in Hungary where he won the bronze medal finishing less than half a second behind silver and just over two seconds behind gold. He finished in 17th place at the 2016 Summer Olympics.

In April 2017, Weinberger was named to Canada's 2017 World Aquatics Championships team in Budapest, Hungary.

Personal
Born in Moose Jaw, Saskatchewan, Weinberger learned to swim at a family pool in a residential compound in Saudi Arabia, where his father was working at the time. He was often moved around as his father is a commercial pilot. Weinberger spent much of his life in Surrey, British Columbia, where he attended Semiahmoo Secondary School, but moved to Victoria, British Columbia to attend the University of Victoria where he currently resides and trains. He swims and trains with Ron Jacks at Pacific Coast Swimming, he got into open water swimming at the University of Victoria after seeing friend Dave Creel doing longer workouts. He admits that swimming in the open water sometimes scares him, as he often encounters wildlife in the water or even the vast depths of the ocean can lead to it getting into his head. He commented on it saying that "If I see anything I'll freak out, but if I don't see anything I'll freak out. It's a lose, lose situation for me."

See also
 List of Olympic medalists in swimming (men)

References

External links
 
 
 
 
 
 

1990 births
Living people
Canadian male freestyle swimmers
Canadian long-distance swimmers
Medalists at the 2012 Summer Olympics
Olympic bronze medalists for Canada
Olympic bronze medalists in swimming
Olympic swimmers of Canada
Pan American Games gold medalists for Canada
People from Moose Jaw
People from Surrey, British Columbia
Swimmers from Victoria, British Columbia
Swimmers at the 2011 Pan American Games
Swimmers at the 2015 Pan American Games
Swimmers at the 2012 Summer Olympics
University of Victoria alumni
Swimmers at the 2016 Summer Olympics
Pan American Games medalists in swimming
Medalists at the 2011 Pan American Games